Alessio Scarpi (born 19 April 1973, in Jesolo) is an Italian football goalkeeper.

Football career

Reggina & Cagliari
Although born in Veneto, Scarpi started his career at Cagliari. He played for Reggina in two Serie B seasons before returning to Cagliari in the summer of 1997; during the 1997–98 season, he helped Cagliari obtain promotion to Serie A with a third-place finish in Serie B. He made his Serie A debut with Cagliari on 13 September 1998, in a 2–2 home draw with Internazionale.

He helped the team avoid relegation until the summer of 2000, as his side finished in second-last place in the league. Cagliari failed to obtain promotion back to Serie A in 2000–01 season, as they only managed a mid-table finish.

Scarpi lost his regular place in the starting line-up during the 2001–02 season, to new signing Armando Pantanelli.

Ancona
Scarpi joined Ancona of Serie B in February 2002.

He was signed by Serie A side Inter on 8 May 2002, but was loaned back to Ancona on 11 July 2002, where he won promotion from Serie B to Serie A once again.

Due to his successful season with the club, his loan was extended on 15 July 2003. Although his second Serie A season was less successful, as he conceded 25 goals in 13 games and failed to prevent the club's relegation, he was signed by Genoa of Serie B on 8 January 2004.

Genoa
Once again, Scarpi helped Genoa obtain Serie A promotion during the 2004–05 season, but due to the club's involvement in a match fixing scandal, Genoa were relegated. He followed Genoa to play in Serie C1, making his personal debut in the Italian third division that season; he played only 14 times for the club during the 2005–06 season, as the regular starting spot was later given to second goalkeeper Massimo Gazzoli, who made 20 appearances. Scarpi returned to Serie B in the summer of 2006, for his 9th season in the Italian second division. Despite the departure of Gazzoli, and subsequently of the youth product Nicola Barasso in January, Scarpi lost his place in the starting line-up yet again to Rubinho. He played only once in the 2006–07 season.

Scarpi followed Genoa back to Serie A in the summer of 2007, his 4th Serie A season. He earned some chances play during the season and made 14 appearances. In 2009–10 season, Genoa swapped Rubinho with Marco Amelia, and that season Scarpi played 8 times. In the next season he became the understudy of Portuguese international Eduardo. On 19 May he signed a new 1-year contract with the club.

Honours
Cagliari
Serie A Promotion: 1997–98 (Serie B Third Place)

Ancona
Serie A Promotion: 2002–03 (Serie B Fourth Place)

Genoa
Serie B Promotion: 2005–06 (Serie C1 Runner-up)
Serie A Promotion: 2006–07 (Serie B Third Place)

References

External links
Profile at Lega-Calcio.it

1973 births
Living people
Italian footballers
Association football goalkeepers
Serie A players
Serie B players
Sportspeople from the Metropolitan City of Venice
Inter Milan players
A.C. Ancona players
Reggina 1914 players
Genoa C.F.C. players
Cagliari Calcio players
Footballers from Veneto
People from Jesolo